The Middle Fork of the Vermilion River is a tributary of the Vermilion River (Wabash River) in Illinois. The Middle Fork rises in Ford County and flows southeast to join the Vermilion near Danville.

In its natural state, the Middle Fork drained a large upland marsh in what is now Ford County. The Middle Fork has been extended into the marsh by drainage ditches.

Parks and access points
The Middle Fork is Illinois' only designated National Wild and Scenic River. Parks and access points include:

Kickapoo State Recreation Area
Middle Fork State Fish and Wildlife Area
Middle Fork River, Champaign County Forest Preserve District

Cities, towns and counties
The following cities, towns and villages are among those in the watershed of the Middle Fork:
Melvin, Illinois
Paxton, Illinois
Potomac, Illinois

Parts of the following counties are drained by the Middle Fork:
Champaign County, Illinois
Ford County, Illinois
Vermilion County, Illinois

See also
List of Illinois rivers

References

External links
American Whitewater
Illinois Dept. Natural Resources
Kickapoo Landing canoe outfitters
Canoe Access Points Map
Prairie Rivers Network
USGS Stream Gage, Middle Fork

Rivers of Illinois
Tributaries of the Wabash River
Wild and Scenic Rivers of the United States
Rivers of Vermilion County, Illinois
Rivers of Ford County, Illinois
Rivers of Champaign County, Illinois